Rosewood Lane is a 2011 American thriller-horror film written and directed by Victor Salva, and stars Rose McGowan. The film's story revolves around a  radio talk show psychiatrist who moves back to her hometown and notices her neighborhood paper boy's unusual behavior. The official trailer of the film was released on the October 14, 2011.

Plot
The story follows Dr. Sonny Blake (McGowan), a radio talk show psychiatrist, when she moves back to her childhood home after her alcoholic father dies. Once back in her old neighborhood, she meets the local paperboy, a cunning, depraved sociopath who targeted her father and now targets her. When the boy starts calling her show and reciting eerie nursery rhymes, an unnerving game of cat-and-mouse begins. When the game escalates, she suddenly finds herself in an all-out war, one that forces her to redefine her ideas of good and evil, and has her fighting to stay alive.

Cast
 Rose McGowan as Sonny Blake
 Daniel Ross Owens as Derek Barber/Paperboy
 Sonny Marinelli as Barrett Tanner
 Lauren Vélez as Paula Crenshaw
 Ray Wise as Det. Briggs
 Tom Tarantini as Det. Mike Sabatino
 Rance Howard as Fred Crumb
 Steve Tom as Glenn Forrester
 Lesley-Anne Down as Dr. Cloey Talbot
 Lin Shaye as Mrs. Hawthorne
 Bill Fagerbakke as Hank Hawthorne
 Judson Mills as Darren Summers

Release

Home media
The film was released on DVD and Blu-ray on September 11, 2012. The film was released again on Blu-ray by Mill Creek Entertainment on February 11, 2020 in a double feature with White Noise: The Light (2007), the latter making its United States Blu-ray debut.

Critical reception
Sean Decker of the Dread Central gave Rosewood Lane 1 out of 5 stars, saying "the film is rife with baffling plot turns, characters who consistently make the most illogical of decisions, abandoned sub-plots (and players), plot holes a'plenty and a second act sequence that betrays the third reel's reveal (a reveal that ultimately makes little sense anyway)".

References

External links
 
 
 

2011 films
2011 horror films
2011 psychological thriller films
American horror thriller films
American psychological horror films
Films directed by Victor Salva
2010s English-language films
2010s American films